Hollywood in Vienna is an annual film music gala hosted in the Vienna Concert Hall where the Max Steiner Film Music Achievement Award is presented.

Overview 
"Hollywood in Vienna" is a red carpet film music gala-concert in the Vienna Concert Hall, where the City of Vienna honours the most prestigious film composers of our time with the »Max Steiner Film Music Achievement Award«. The gala has established itself as one of the leading film music events world-wide and is broadcast via TV to 35 countries.

The gala concert was initiated in 2007 by Sandra Tomek, Tomek Productions, and has since then been produced by Tomek Productions and Echo Medienhaus and co-produced by Michael Balgavy. The gala also commemorates the composers who emigrated from Vienna in the 20th century to establish the classic Hollywood sound in Hollywood. The composers included Erich Wolfgang Korngold, Max Steiner, Arnold Schönberg and others. 

In recent years, world-famous film music composers such as Danny Elfman, Alexandre Desplat, Randy Newman, Hans Zimmer and, 2019 Gabriel Yared have been among the awardees.

In the course of the celebrations, the honored composers also hold lectures and workshops at the associated "International Film Music Symposium Vienna" (FIMU Vienna) in order to promote young musicians.

The concerts with star guest Alan Menken was originally planned for October 2020, had to be postponed to September 2022 due to the COVID-19 pandemic.

Max Steiner Film Music Achievement Award 

The award is given as a symbol of recognition for exceptional achievements in the art of film music.

The Max Steiner Award commemorates the Viennese composer Max Steiner, who invented the essential techniques of film scoring back in the 1920s and wrote the first large orchestral soundtrack in film history for King Kong (1933). While working at RKO and Warner Brothers, Steiner composed more than 300 film scores including Gone with the Wind (1939) and Casablanca (1942). He also composed the Warner Bros Studio Fanfare. He was awarded with three Academy Awards and is considered as the "Father of Film Music" in Hollywood.

Awardees 
 2009: John Barry
 2010: Howard Shore
 2011: Alan Silvestri
 2012: Lalo Schifrin
 2013: James Horner
 2014: Randy Newman
 2015: James Newton Howard
 2016: Alexandre Desplat
 2017: Danny Elfman
 2018: Hans Zimmer
 2019: Gabriel Yared
 2022: Alan Menken

Conductors 
 2007: John Mauceri
 2009-2011: John Axelrod
 2012-2014: David Newman
 2015–2016: Keith Lockhart
 2017: James Shearman & John Mauceri
 2018: Martin Gellner
 2019: Keith Lockhart
 2022: Michael Kosarin
 2023: Randy Miller

Orchestra 
The ORF Vienna Radio Symphony Orchestra

Guests, Artists and Contributors 
Keith Lockhart, John Mauceri, Marc Shaiman, Lisa Gerrard, David Newman, Judith Hill, Olga Scheps, Ramon Vargas, Yury Revich, Frantisek Janoska, Drew Sarich, Valentian Nafornita, Aleksey Igudesman, Lebo M, Louise Dearman, Steven Gätjen, Martin Haselböck, Staatsopernballet (wie immer man das schreibt), Wiener Sängerknaben, Bolschoi Don Kosaken, Richard Bellis, Daniela Fally, Emmanuel Tjeknavorian, Superar Kinderchor, Cassandra Steen, Adrian Eröd, Ildiko Raimondi, Deborah Cox, Jeremy Schonfeld, David Arnold, Al Jarreau, Lalo Schifrin, Natalia Ushakova, Bruce Broughton, David Arnold, Alan Silvestri, Howard Shore, Harald Kloser, Alexander Frey, Barbara Broccoli, John Mauceri, James Shearman, Kate Barry, Klaus Badelt, Nicholas Dodd, Rick Porras, Gedeon Burkhard, John Axelrod, Kevin Costner, John Barry, Patrick Doyle, John Powell, Robert Dornhelm, Rebekka Bakken, Juan Garcia-Herreros, Alastair King, Christian Kolonovits, among others.

References 

 Alan Menken to receive Max Steiner Award In: variety.com. 29. Feb. 2020
 Composer Gabriel Yared to Receive Max Steiner Award at Vienna Gala In: variety.com. 28. April 2019
 Hans Zimmer to receive Steiner Awart at Hollywood in Vienna Gala In: variety.com. 21. April 2018
 "Hollywood in Vienna": Hans Zimmer erhält Max Steiner Award In: Die Presse. 21. April 2018
 BMI Composer Danny Elfman Receives Max Steiner Award at Hollywood in Vienna In: bmi.com. 7. Okt. 2017
 Composer Alexandre Desplat to Receive Max Steiner Film Music Award at Hollywood in Vienna Gala In: billboard.com. 27. April 2016
 "Hunger Games" Composer James Newton Howard to Receive Max Steiner Award In: variety.com. 25. März 2015
 Roots Run Deep at Hollywood in Vienna, Where Randy Newman Is Being Honored In: variety.com. 11. Sept. 2014

External links 
 Hollywood in Vienna
 Tomek Productions

Music festivals in Austria
Festivals in Vienna